Stefano Vetrano (25 March 1923 – 1 August 2018) was an Italian politician who served as a Deputy representing the Italian Communist Party from 1968 to 1975, and held a degree in industrial chemistry. He died at the age of 95 in Baiano, Province of Avellino, on 1 August 2018.

References

1923 births
2018 deaths
Italian Communist Party politicians
Politicians of Campania
Deputies of Legislature VI of Italy
Deputies of Legislature V of Italy